Gynecological surgery refers to surgery on the female reproductive system usually performed by gynecologists. It includes procedures for benign conditions, cancer, infertility, and incontinence. Gynecological surgery may occasionally be performed for optional or cosmetic purposes, such as hymenoplasty or labiaplasty.

Gynecologic Procedures 

Following are different types of Gynecologic Procedures-

 Cervical Cryosurgery

 Colposcopy

 Dilation and Curettage (D&C)

 Hysteroscopy

 LEEP Procedure

 Pelvic Laparoscopy

Gynecologic Procedures 

Gynecological surgery includes:

 Removal of ovarian cyst

 surgical contraception, and

 Hysterectomy

Technology Development 

With the advancement of technology there has been robot-assisted surgery in many areas. It helps in avoiding extra testing and other instruments.

Gynecologic Procedures

References